Syed Amjad Ali Zaidi is a Pakistani politician who is member-elect of the Gilgit Baltistan Assembly.

Political career
Zaidi contested 2020 Gilgit-Baltistan Assembly election on 15 November 2020 from constituency GBA-11 (Kharmang) on the ticket of Pakistan Tehreek-e-Insaf. He won the election by the margin of 3,945 votes over the runner up Independent Iqbal Hussain. He garnered 6,604 votes while Hussain received 2,659 votes.

References

Living people
Gilgit-Baltistan MLAs 2020–2025
Politicians from Gilgit-Baltistan
Year of birth missing (living people)